Michael Wood may refer to:

Sportspeople
Michael Wood (rugby union) (born 1999), Australian rugby union player
Mick Wood (footballer, born 1952), English association footballer
Mick Wood (footballer, born 1962), English association footballer
Mike Wood (American football) (born 1954), American football player
Mike Wood (baseball) (born 1980), American baseball player
Mike Wood (curler) (born 1968), Canadian curler
Mike Wood (fencer) (born 1971), South African épée fencer

Others
Michael M. Wood (born 1947), American diplomat and ambassador
Michael Wood (literary scholar) (active since 1971), former chair of the Princeton University English Department
Michael Wood (cryptographer), American author The Jesus Secret 2010
Michael Wood (doctor) (1918–1987), British doctor in East Africa
Michael Wood (historian) (born 1948), British historian and television presenter
Michael Wood (lawyer) (born 1947), British lawyer and former chief advisor to the Foreign and Commonwealth Office
Michael Wood (New Zealand politician) (born 1980), New Zealand member of parliament
Michael Wood (special effects artist), American special effects artist
Mike Wood (Labour politician) (born 1946), British MP for Batley and Spen from 1997 to 2015
Mike Wood (Conservative politician) (born 1976), MP for Dudley South since May 2015

See also
Michaelwood services, a motorway service area in the United Kingdom
Michael Woods (disambiguation)